Enrique Ledesma (born 2 September 1958) is an Ecuadorian swimmer. He competed in two events at the 1980 Summer Olympics.

References

1958 births
Living people
Ecuadorian male swimmers
Olympic swimmers of Ecuador
Swimmers at the 1980 Summer Olympics
Place of birth missing (living people)
20th-century Ecuadorian people